Gabriel Xavier Paul Koenigs (17 January 1858 in Toulouse, France – 29 October 1931 in Paris, France) was a French mathematician who worked on analysis and geometry. He was elected as Secretary General of the Executive Committee of the International Mathematical Union after the first world war, and used his position to exclude countries with whom France had been at war from the mathematical congresses.

He was awarded the Poncelet Prize for 1893.

Publications 
 Koenigs G. Recherches sur les intégrals de certaines équations fontionnelles. Ann. École Normale, Suppl., 1884, (3)1.

See also
 Koenigs function
 Schröder's equation

References

French mathematicians
Members of the French Academy of Sciences
1858 births
1931 deaths